Enrique Rodríguez Cal (19 November 1951 – 23 November 2022) was a Spanish boxer who won the bronze medal in the light flyweight division (– 48 kg) division at the 1972 Summer Olympics. It was Spain's only medal in Munich, West Germany. He captured the bronze medal at the inaugural 1974 World Championships in Havana, Cuba. Rodríguez also represented his native country at the 1976 Summer Olympics, where he was eliminated in the first round, and carried the flag at the opening ceremony.

Rodríguez died on 23 November 2022, at the age of 71.

Olympic results
1972
Defeated Alexandru Turei (Romania) 3-2
Defeated Davey Armstrong (United States) 5-0
Defeated Rafael Carbonell (Cuba) 4-1
Lost to Kim U-Gil (North Korea) 2-3

1976
Lost to Serdamba Batsuk (Mongolia) RSC 3

External links

References

Sources
 Spanish Olympic Committee

1951 births
2022 deaths
Sportspeople from Asturias
Flyweight boxers
Boxers at the 1972 Summer Olympics
Boxers at the 1976 Summer Olympics
Olympic boxers of Spain
Olympic bronze medalists for Spain
Olympic medalists in boxing
Spanish male boxers
AIBA World Boxing Championships medalists
Medalists at the 1972 Summer Olympics
Mediterranean Games medalists in boxing
Mediterranean Games gold medalists for Spain
Competitors at the 1971 Mediterranean Games
Competitors at the 1975 Mediterranean Games
20th-century Spanish people
21st-century Spanish people